Mara Thyutlia Py (MTP) is the largest Non-governmental Organisation in Maraland, Mizoram state, India. Mara Thyutlia Py literally means Mara Young Organisation/Association. It has its headquarters at Siaha - the capital of Mara Autonomous District Council. It draws members across Maraland from the age group of teen age to late 40s.

Related links
Maraland.NET: The home of the Mara People
Mara portal in English
Siaha Online website

Saiha
Organisations based in Mizoram
1954 establishments in India